'Abd ul Jalil (sometimes called Selma in older sources) was the last king in the Duguwa dynasty of the Kanem Empire. His short rule lasted from approximately 1081 until 1085, when he was overthrown by Muslim followers of Hummay, the first Muslim king of the Sefuwa dynasty.

References 

Rulers of the Kanem Empire
11th-century monarchs in Africa